Hi Jolly or Hadji Ali, also known as Philip Tedro (born 'Ali al-Hajaya  – December 16, 1902), was an Ottoman subject of Syrian and Greek parentage, and in 1856 became one of the first camel drivers ever hired by the US Army to lead the camel driver experiment in the Southwest.

Biography
Ali was born as Philip Tedro in Smyrna around 1828, to a Greek mother and a Syrian father who was a Christian Arab. As a young adult, he converted to Islam. After going to Mecca to perform the hajj (pilgrimage), he called himself Hadji Ali. He reverted to Philip Tedro in later life.

An Ottoman Turkish citizen of Greater Syria, Ali worked as a camel breeder and trainer. He served with the French Army in Algiers before signing on as a camel driver for the US Army in 1856.

Ali was one of several men hired by the United States Army to introduce camels as beasts of burden to transport cargo across the "Great American Desert." Eight of the men – including Ali – were of Greek origin. The book Go West Greek George by Steven Dean Pastis, published in both Greek and English, specifically identifies all eight men. These pioneers were Yiorgos Caralambo (later known as Greek George), Hadji Ali (Hi Jolly, a.k.a. Philip Tedro), Mimico Teodora (Mico), Hadjiatis Yannaco (Long Tom), Anastasio Coralli (Short Tom), Michelo Georgios, Yanni Iliato, and Giorgios Costi. The Americans acquired three camels in Tunis, nine in Egypt, and 21 in Smyrna: 33 in all. Ali was the lead camel driver during the US Army's experiment with the U.S. Camel Corps in using camels in the dry deserts of the Southwest. After successfully traveling round trip from Texas to California, the experiment failed, partly due to the problem that the Army's burros, horses, and mules feared the large animals, often panicking, and the tensions of the American Civil War led to Congress not approving more funds for the Corps. In 1864, the camels were finally auctioned off in Benicia, California, and Camp Verde, Texas. Ali was discharged from the Quartermaster Department of the U.S. Army at Fort McDowell in 1870.

Ali next ran a freight service between the Colorado River and the mining establishments further east, using the few camels he had purchased. His business was unsuccessful, however, and he released his camels into the desert near Gila Bend. He became an American citizen in 1880, and he used his birth name of Philip Tedro (sometimes spelled Teadrow) when he married Gertrudis Serna in Tucson, Arizona. They had two children. In 1885, Ali was again hired by the U.S. Army in Arizona, and worked with pack mules for Brig. Gen. George Crook during the Geronimo campaign.

Hi Jolly's work in the US Camel Corps earned him a reputation as a living legend until his death in Arizona.

In his final years, Ali moved to Quartzsite, Arizona, where he mined and occasionally scouted for the US government. He died in 1902 and was buried in the Quartzsite Cemetery.

Gravesite and monument

In 1935, Arizona Governor Benjamin Moeur dedicated a monument to Hadji Ali and the Camel Corps in the Quartzsite Cemetery. The monument, located at his gravesite, is a pyramid built from local stones and topped with a copper camel, and is listed on the National Register of Historic Places. The monument is the most visited location in Quartzsite.

Legacy
 The folk song "Hi Jolly" is based on Hadji Ali's exploits.
 The 1954 movie Southwest Passage and the 1976 movie Hawmps! were based on the camel experiment.
 The 1959 novel Hi Jolly by children's book author Jim Kjelgaard, also covers his story in a fictionalized form for young readers.
 A slightly fictionalized version of Hadji Ali appears in the 1982 Lucky Luke comic album La Corde du pendu.
 The 2018 children's book Route 66 by Frédéric Marais tells about the camel experiment and Hadji Ali.
 The 2019 novel Inland by Téa Obreht includes a character based on Hadji Ali.

References

External links
 Town of Quartzsite Official Site: Grave of "Hi Jolly"
 
 Out West newspaper: U.S. Camel Corps remembered in Quartzsite, Arizona
 Philip Tedro at Hellenic Communication Service
 Atlas Obscura
 "Hi Jolly" (1963) song performed by New Christy Minstrels on YouTube

Hadji Ali
Hadji Ali
19th-century Greek Americans
American folklore
Hadji Ali
American people of Jordanian descent
Burials in Arizona
Camel drivers
Converts to Islam
Emigrants from the Ottoman Empire to the United States
Hadji Ali
People from İzmir
Hadji Ali
Hadji Ali